Epiricania hagoromo is a moth in the Epipyropidae family. It was described by Katô in 1939. It is found in Japan.

References

Moths described in 1939
Epipyropidae